Hanover is a borough in York County, Pennsylvania, United States,  southwest of York and  north-northwest of Baltimore, Maryland and is  north of the Mason-Dixon line. The town is situated in a productive agricultural region. The population was 16,429 at the 2020 census. The borough is served by the 717 area code and the ZIP Codes of 17331-34. Hanover is named after the German city of Hannover.

The site of the final encounter between the Union and Confederate States armies before they fought against each other in the Battle of Gettysburg during the American Civil War, this borough has since become known as the "Snack Food Capital of the World" due to the establishment of multiple food manufacturing businesses there during the 20th century.

History
The area was called Digges Choice, and in 1730, a group of Catholics started the settlement that became known as the Conewego Settlement. Settlers from both Maryland and Pennsylvania began moving into the area in the 1730s. At this time,  Maryland and Pennsylvania did not agree on the northern border of Maryland and the southern border of Pennsylvania, and the area that is now Hanover was in the disputed area claimed by both states. This led to numerous disputes about property ownership from the 1730s until 1760. The dispute was settled when Maryland and Pennsylvania hired British experts Charles Mason and Jeremiah Dixon to survey what became known as the Mason–Dixon Line. This line was surveyed between 1763 and 1767, and put an end to decades of disputes over rights and ownership.

In 1745, a Scot-Irishman named Richard McAllister (father of Matthew McAllister) purchased the tract of land upon which the original town of Hanover was built. McAllister was a Presbyterian who had recently migrated from the Cumberland Valley. Hanover at that time was covered with a dense forest of hickory, walnut, and oak trees. McAllister erected a log house at what is now the corner of Baltimore and Middle streets, and opened a store and tavern. In 1763, McAllister divided his farm into lots and founded the town of Hanover. German settlers nicknamed the settlement "Hickory Town" after the thick groves of hickory trees that grew in the area. The name Hanover was suggested by Michael Tanner, who was one of the commissioners who laid out York County in 1749 and owned large tracts of land southeast of the town. Tanner's choice of the name came from the fact that he was a native of Hannover, Germany. The town's founders, who wanted to please the German settlers, agreed to the name. Hanover was also sometimes referred to as "McAllister's Town" in its early years.

Hanover and the American Revolution
Thomas Jefferson spent the night of April 12, 1776 at the Sign of the Horse, an inn, owned by Caspar Reinecker on Frederick Street. Records indicate that Jefferson paid "Rhenegher" 11 shillings, 6 pence for dinner and lodging. He was on his way from Monticello to Philadelphia to attend the first meeting of the Continental Congress, where on June 10 he would begin to draft the Declaration of Independence. At the time, Hanover was located at the crossing of two well-traveled roads, one from the port of Baltimore to points north and west and the other between Philadelphia and the Valley of Virginia. When Jefferson returned from Philadelphia to Monticello, he again dined and spent the night of September 5 at Reinecker's inn.

At the start of the Revolutionary War, Hanover consisted of about 500 homes, most of which were built out of logs. After the war, the population increased steadily until the War of 1812. At the time of the advance of the British on Baltimore in 1814, Hanover and vicinity furnished two companies of infantry commanded by Captain Frederick Metzgar and John Bair. These two companies left Hanover on foot Sunday morning, August 28, 1814, and reached the city of Baltimore at 9 A.M., Tuesday. September 11, where they were marched to North Point, spending that night on their arms, and next day, the memorable September 12, 1814, they took part in the engagement with the British, who retreated soon after. The Hanover Companies together with other companies from York County, returned home after two weeks' service, not being needed longer.

After the War of 1812, the town experienced only minor growth until 1852, when construction of the Hanover Branch Railroad to Hanover Junction was completed. In 1858 the Gettysburg Railroad opened a railroad link westward to Gettysburg. The Hanover and York Railroad completed a rail line to York in 1876.

Civil War era

During the American Civil War, the Battle of Hanover was fought on June 30, 1863. Union cavalry under Judson Kilpatrick encountered Confederate cavalry under J.E.B. Stuart and a sharp fight ensued in the town and in farm fields to the south, particularly along Frederick Street. The final encounter between Union and Confederate forces prior to the Battle of Gettysburg, this inconclusive engagement delayed the Confederate cavalry on their way to the Battle of Gettysburg. Three days before the battle, another detachment of Virginia cavalry had briefly occupied Hanover, "collecting" supplies and horses from local citizens.

Over the years, its industries have included the making of cigars, gloves, silks, flavine, water wheels, flour, shirts, shoes, machine-shop products, furniture, wire cloth, and ironstone grinders.

The town has lent its name to a brand of canned vegetables, and a mail-order gift company based there. Hanover's first newspaper, Die Pennsylvania Wochenschrift, was published in German in 1797. In 1805, the "Hanover Gazette" followed suit, also published in German.

The Hanover Historic District, Eichelberger High School, George Nace (Neas) House, and US Post Office-Hanover are listed on the National Register of Historic Places.

Modern era
On July 13, 1991, Hanover's town square was the site of a two-day race riot. During the summer, White residents were upset by the presence of young Black men in the town square, who had begun to gather there after the local parks were temporarily closed. In addition, two young, interracial couples had been seen walking downtown. In the lead-up to the riot, White residents spat on the Black men visiting their girlfriends in the town square, while the Baltimore Sun reported that there had been tension "building for several weeks," and the Hanover Evening Sun reported that at least one resident "had heard rumors throughout the week that a motorcycle gang was coming into town to start trouble with a few interracial groups of juveniles." Other residents were quoted stating that the biker gang's explicit purpose was to "take back the town." On July 13, by around 11:00pm, an estimated 200 to 400 White people gathered on one side of the town square, with a much smaller group of a "half dozen" Black juveniles on the other side, with various police forming a line between the two. Both groups shouted at one another throughout the night. Eventually, a car full of Black juveniles pulled up alongside the bikers before some of the bikers began chasing the car down the alleyway, which elicited a cheer from some members of the White crowd. The police line struggled to contain the rioters and eventually ordered the smaller, Black crowd to disperse just after 11:00pm. As the smaller side dispersed, police lost control of the rioters, who began to fight using weapons like "baseball bats, knives, tire chains, bricks and hockey sticks," though there was only one serious injury reported. Eleven people were arrested during the first night; on the second day, a state of emergency was declared by Mayor W. Roy Attlesberger, who instructed police to arrest anyone on the streets after midnight. Police shut down major roadways into Hanover. Nevertheless, many minor skirmishes broke out, and ultimately thirty six people were arrested including the eleven from the day prior. Media reports following the two-day event described the town square as looking like a "battlefield." In the aftermath of the riot, according to the Baltimore Sun, "many residents interviewed yesterday shared the view ... [blaming]  the troubles on the two women for dating Black men and bringing them into Hanover," many of whom also referred to the Black residents as "coloreds."

On October 24, 2018, Hanover Borough's first African-American mayor was sworn in. Hanover Borough council selected Myneca Ojo, 56, to fill the office recently vacated by Ben Adams, who moved away from the community. Myneca Ojo was the former Director of Diversity at the Pennsylvania Turnpike Commission. She is the second woman to be mayor in the borough. Margret Hormel was the first woman mayor, serving from 1993 to 2007.

Demographics

As of the 2010 census, there were 15,289 people and 6,571 households in the borough. The population density was 4,117.7 inhabitants per square mile (10,665/km2). There were 7,263 housing units and the racial makeup of the borough was 91.9% White, 1.2% African American, 0.2% Native American, 1.0% Asian, 1% Pacific Islander, 0.74% from other races, and 1.6% from two or more races. Hispanic or Latino of any race were 7.3% of the population. The ancestries for Hanover include: German (42%), Irish (11%), United States (10%), English (8%), Italian (3%), and Dutch (2%).

Of the 6,571 households, 23.4% had children under the age of 18 living with them, 44.6% were married couples living together, 9.4% had a female householder with no husband present, and 42.2% were non-families. 36.3% of all households were made up of individuals, and 16.6% had someone living alone who was 65 years of age or older. The average household size was 2.16 and the average family size was 2.81.

In the borough the population was spread out, with 20.1% under the age of 18, 8.0% from 18 to 24, 28.0% from 25 to 44, 22.6% from 45 to 64, and 21.2% who were 65 years of age or older. The median age was 40 years. For every 100 females, there were 91.4 males. For every 100 females age 18 and over, there were 87.5 males.

The median income for a household in the borough was $45,110, and the median income for a family was $45,156. Males had a median income of $31,206 versus $21,512 for females. The per capita income for the borough was $20,516. About 4.5% of families and 7.7% of the population were below the poverty line, including 8.7% of those under age 18 and 6.4% of those age 65 or over.

The Greater Hanover area has a population of about 55,000 residents. The community is made up of several areas such as Hanover Borough, Penn Township, Heidelberg Township, Manheim Township, West Manheim Township, Conewago Township, Berwick Township, and Union Township. All of these areas have Hanover, PA listed as their address and 17331 as their zip code.

Business

Manufacturing
Hanover is considered by many to be the snack food capital of the United States and has been featured multiple times on the Food Network.
It has been home to Utz Quality Foods since 1921 which still produces its products there (along with an Utz outlet store) and Snyder's of Hanover since 1905. In nearby areas there are other snack food makers including Hanover Foods, Wolfgang Candy, Martin's Potato Chips, Stauffer Biscuit Company, Hershey Foods, Herr's Snacks and Gibbles Potato Chips, among others.

Emeco founded in 1944 manufactures designer furniture, including their signature Navy Chair. Menchey Music Service was founded in Hanover in 1936 and maintains its headquarters at the same location. The Vulcan Materials Company owns a large limestone quarry located to the north of Hanover, with an office on Oxford Avenue.

Shopping
Retail shopping areas in Hanover include "The Golden Mile" along Eisenhower Drive, downtown Hanover, Gateway Hanover, and North Hanover Mall.

Education
The Hanover area is served by five school districts, and has two Catholic elementary schools and one Catholic high school.

The Hanover Public School District serves Hanover Borough and has five schools:
Clearview Elementary School
Hanover Street Elementary School
Washington Elementary School
Hanover Middle School
Hanover High School

The South Western School District serves the area around Hanover Borough, which includes Penn Township, Manheim Township and West Manheim Township. South Western School District operates six schools:
Baresville Elementary School
Park Hills Elementary School
West Manheim Elementary School
Manheim Elementary School
Emory H. Markle Middle School (Formerly Emory H. Markle Intermediate School, changed in the beginning of the 2020-2021 school year)
South Western High School

Heidelberg Township is served by the Spring Grove Area School District.

Conewago and Berwick Townships are served by the Conewago Valley School District.

Union Township is served by the Littlestown Area School District.

The Catholic elementary schools are St. Teresa of Calcutta Catholic School and St. Joseph Catholic School. The Catholic high school is Delone Catholic High School in adjacent McSherrystown, Pennsylvania.

Despite Hanover area's size, there are no colleges. However, the Empire Beauty School has a campus in Hanover, and the Practical Nursing Program previously had classrooms at Hanover High School; the Practical Nursing Program is no longer in existence. HACC and York College also offer classes at Hanover and South Western high schools. Pennsylvania State University's York Campus also offers select classes in the Hanover area.

Places of interest

Some local places of interest in the Hanover area include:
Neas House - Local history museum of the Hanover Area Historical Society
Hanover Shoe Company – A large shoe factory from 1910, now converted into apartments.
Codorus State Park has a large artificial lake, pontoon boat rentals, motor boat rentals, canoe rentals, row boat rentals, paddle boats, disc golf courses, and one of the largest pools in the Commonwealth of Pennsylvania
R H Sheppard Museum - Diesel engine museum with wide array of exhibits. Audio tour available in English and Spanish.
Eichelberger Performing Arts Center - The former high school built in 1896, now in the former auditorium. It hosts many shows and events throughout the year.

Transportation
The Hanover area is served by Pennsylvania Routes 94, 194, 116, and 216. Route 94 (Carlisle Street/Pike and Baltimore Street/Pike) intersects with Route 194 at the square and extends north to Carlisle, PA and south to Baltimore, MD. Route 194 (Broadway/Abbottstown Pike and Frederick Street/Hanover Pike) intersects with Route 94 and Route 116 at the square and extends north to Dillsburg, PA and south to Frederick, MD. Route 116 (York Street/Road and High Street/Hanover Road) overlaps Route 194 and runs through the square for three blocks. It extends west to Gettysburg, PA and east to Spring Grove, PA. Route 216 (Blooming Grove Road) branches southwest off of Route 116 and runs through Codorus State Park.

Hanover is served by 4 routes of the Rabbit Transit bus system. Route #16 connects Downtown Hanover to Downtown York. An unnumbered route transports employees from York to Hanover. Route #21 connects Downtown Hanover with North Hanover and the Homewood Retirement Village. Route #22 connects Downtown Hanover with North Hanover and South Hanover.

Notable people

 Adaline Hohf Beery (1859–1929), American author, newspaper editor, songbook compiler, hymnwriter
 Al Bemiller (1938-2022), American football player
 Matthias N. Forney (1835-1908), American steam locomotive inventor and engineer, creator of the Forney engines used in early New York City elevated railways.
 Christian Gobrecht (1785-1844), Chief Engraver of the United States Mint
 Donora Hillard, author and current resident 
 John Luther Long (1861-1927), author of the short story "Madame Butterfly," later a Puccini opera
 The Pixies Three – Teenage girl-group trio from 1963-1965 ("Birthday Party", "442 Glenwood Avenue")

Movies 
The bowling scene in the movie Girl, Interrupted was filmed in the basement of the Sheppard Mansion. The mansion and its twin, Myers Mansion, across town both still have bowling alleys in their basements.

References

External links

 Borough of Hanover, Pennsylvania (official website), retrieved online September 19, 2019.

 
American Civil War sites
Populated places established in 1730
Populated places in York County, Pennsylvania
Pennsylvania in the American Civil War
1730 establishments in Pennsylvania
Scotch-Irish American culture in Pennsylvania